The 2005 Mojo Honours List.

Nominees
Complete list of nominees (winners in bold):

 Best New Act - presented to an act whose impact has been unparalleled in the last 18 months
 Antony and the Johnsons
 Ray LaMontagne
 Rufus Wainwright
 Arcade Fire
 Willy Mason
 The Magic Numbers
 Inspiration Award - presented to an act who has been the catalyst for an entire generation and fellow musicians
 Pixies
 Gang of Four
 Tom Waits
 Morrissey
 Neil Young
 Mojo Icon - the recipient of this award has enjoyed a spectacular career on a global scale
 David Bowie
 John Lydon
 Siouxsie Sioux
 Marc Bolan
 Ramones
 Catalogue Release of the Year - presented to the reissue that is both definitive and beautifully packaged
 The Mamas & the Papas - Complete Anthology
 The Clash - London Calling 25th Anniversary Edition
 Jeff Buckley - Grace 10th Anniversary Edition
 The Kinks - The Kinks Are the Village Green Preservation Society
 Jack Nitzsche Story 1962-1979 - Hearing is Believing
 The Fall - The Complete Peel Sessions 1978–2004
 Vision Award - presented to the best music DVD package of the year in recognition of sales and visual flair
 AC/DC - Family Jewels
 Elvis Presley - '68 Comeback Special
 Live Aid
 Martin Scorsese Presents the Blues
 Marc Bolan and T.Rex - Born to Boogie
 The Rolling Stones - Rock and Roll Circus
 Songwriter Award - presented to an artist whose career has been defined by their ability to pen classic material on a consistent basis
 Paul Weller
 Brian Wilson
 Damien Rice
 Van Morrison
 Kate Bush
 Classic Album - presented by Mojo to an artist responsible for a landmark release in the history of rock
 The Pogues - Rum, Sodomy, and the Lash
 Roots Award
 Chris Hillman
 Legend Award
 Dr. John
 Hero Award
 Roy Harper
 Lifetime Achievement Award - the ultimate accolade that celebrates a unique contribution as we know it
 Robert Wyatt
 Merit Award
 Sly and Robbie
 Image Award - presented to a photographer whose work has captured and defined the very essence of rock'n'roll
 Jim Marshall
 Hall of Fame - presented to an act or solo star who is best described as "an artists' artist"
 Madness
 Les Paul Award - presented in conjunction with legendary guitarist Les Paul to an inspirational player
 Jeff Beck
 Mojo Medal - presented to an unsung industry hero whose contribution has changed the face of music as we know it
 Chess Records
 Maverick Award
 Steve Earle
 Special Commendation for Hippo Select part of Universal USA for the following releases:
 The Complete Motown Singles Vol 1: 59-61
 Burt Bacharach - Something Big
 Doug Sahm & the Sir Douglas Quintet
 Muddy Waters (McKinley Morganfield) - Hoochie Coochie Man: The Complete Chess Masters Vol 2, 1952-1958

References

External links
 Mojo magazine

Mojo
British music awards
2005 awards in the United Kingdom
2005 in London
Mojo